Piz Chapisun (2,931 m) is a mountain of the Silvretta Alps, overlooking Lavin in the canton of Graubünden. It lies at the southern end of the range south of Piz Buin, between the Val Lavinuoz and the Val Tuoi.

References

External links
 Piz Chapisun on Hikr

Mountains of the Alps
Mountains of Graubünden
Mountains of Switzerland
Two-thousanders of Switzerland
Zernez